Jane Wipf (born April 10, 1958) is a retired female long-distance runner from the United States. She won the inaugural 1981 edition of the Enschede Marathon, clocking a total time of 2:38:21.

Achievements

References

External links

1958 births
Living people
American female long-distance runners
American female marathon runners
20th-century American women